Bowers Glacier is a glacier at the west side of Mount Northampton in the Victory Mountains, flowing north into Tucker Glacier, Victoria Land. It was mapped by the United States Geological Survey  from surveys and from U.S. Navy air photos, 1960–62, and named by the Advisory Committee on Antarctic Names for Chester H. Bowers, meteorologist, senior U.S. representative at Hallett Station, 1962.

References
 

Glaciers of Borchgrevink Coast